The 1979–80 Magyar Kupa (English: Hungarian Cup) was the 40th season of Hungary's annual knock-out cup football competition.

Final

See also
 1979–80 Nemzeti Bajnokság I

References

External links
 Official site 
 soccerway.com

1979–80 in Hungarian football
1979–80 domestic association football cups
1979-80